FlashForward is an American television series, adapted for television by Brannon Braga and David S. Goyer, which aired for one season on ABC between September 24, 2009, and May 27, 2010. It is based on the 1999 novel Flashforward by Canadian science fiction writer Robert J. Sawyer. The series revolves around the lives of several people as a mysterious event causes nearly everyone on the planet to simultaneously lose consciousness for two minutes and seventeen seconds on October 6, 2009. During this blackout, people see what appear to be visions of their lives on April 29, 2010, a global "flashforward" six months into the future.

In May 2010, ABC announced that FlashForward had been cancelled.  The season finale for Season 1 was shot before it was known the show would be cancelled and showed another flashforward event happening more than 20 years in the future. This more closely followed the original book, which featured a flashforward that peered 21½ years into the future.

Premise 
FlashForward is constructed around a high-concept narrative where a mysterious event has caused nearly everyone on the planet to simultaneously lose consciousness for 137 seconds, during which time people see what appears to be a vision of their own life approximately six months in the future: a global "flashforward". A team of Los Angeles FBI agents, led by Stanford Wedeck (Vance) and spearheaded by Mark Benford (Fiennes) and his partner Demetri Noh (Cho), begin the process of determining what happened, why, and whether it will happen again. Benford contributes a unique perspective on the investigation; in his flashforward, he saw the results of six months of investigation that he had done on the flashforward event, and he and his team use those clues to recreate the investigation.

The team investigates a number of events related to the flashforward, including "Suspect Zero", who did not lose consciousness during the event because of a quantum entanglement device (QED), the sinister "D. Gibbons/Dyson Frost", and a similar mass loss of consciousness in Somalia many years earlier in 1991. Meanwhile, personal revelations contained within the flashforwards occupy the personal lives of the principal characters. Mark Benford sees himself relapsing into alcoholism; his wife sees herself with another man; Demetri Noh sees nothing, which could mean that he will not be alive to see the day everyone else has glimpsed or, perhaps, that his future was not set on the day of the flashforward. Other characters grapple with similarly unexpected or surprising revelations in their flashforwards.

Cast and characters

Main characters 
 Joseph Fiennes as FBI Special Agent Mark Benford – Mark's flashforward guides the investigation of the events of October 6. The husband of Olivia Benford and father of Charlie Benford, he is a recovering alcoholic. In his flashforward, he sees himself working on the Mosaic investigation when armed masked men enter his office. He also sees himself drinking, which he tries to hide from his wife. (22 episodes)
 John Cho as FBI Special Agent Demetri Noh – Mark Benford's partner at the FBI. He had no flashforward and fears that means he will die, especially after he receives a mysterious phone call telling him that he will be murdered. He is engaged to Zoey, a lawyer who believed her flashforward was about their wedding until she realized it was possibly his funeral. Demetri survives March 15, the date he was supposed to have been killed, thanks to Mark's assistance. (22 episodes)
 Courtney B. Vance as FBI Assistant Director Stanford Wedeck – head of the FBI Los Angeles field office. He oversees Mark Benford's team and the October 6 investigation. His flashforward shows him on a toilet reading a newspaper. (22 episodes)
 Sonya Walger as Dr. Olivia Benford – Mark's wife and a successful surgeon at a major hospital. She supervises Dr. Bryce Varley. In her flashforward, she is romantically involved with Dr. Lloyd Simcoe, although she had never met him before the blackout. They meet when she treats his autistic son, Dylan. (21 episodes)
 Christine Woods as FBI Special Agent Janis Hawk – works at the Los Angeles field office as part of Mark Benford's team. In her vision she was pregnant and having a sonogram, which she finds hard to believe because she is single and a lesbian. She is in charge of watching over Simon later in the series. In "Queen Sacrifice", it was revealed that she is a mole reporting to those responsible for the blackout to keep tabs on the FBI's investigation. In "Goodbye Yellow Brick Road", it is revealed that she is actually a double agent for both the FBI and CIA and at the request of Agent Vogel (who is her CIA contact and handler) was directed to investigate and identify the mysterious blackout conspirators. (18 episodes)
 Jack Davenport as Dr. Lloyd Simcoe – an academic at Stanford. Lloyd's estranged wife and mother of his son died during the blackout. He has a son with autism, Dylan, who knows Olivia and whom Charlie mysteriously recognizes. His research partner is Simon Campos, and Lloyd believes they are responsible for the blackout but, according to Simon's uncle, Teddy, they only amplified it, causing it to affect the whole world. (17 episodes)
 Zachary Knighton as Dr. Bryce Varley – a surgical intern reporting to Dr. Olivia Benford. He was on the verge of committing suicide due to a diagnosis of stage 4 renal cell carcinoma (kidney cancer) when the blackout occurred. After the blackout he experiences a renewed will to live, and sees his vision as a gift. In "Course Correction", Bryce learns that his cancer is in remission. (16 episodes)
 Peyton List as Nicole Kirby – a 19-year-old student and Charlie Benford's babysitter. She was a childhood friend of Aaron Stark's daughter, Tracy. Nicole's flashforward shows her being held underwater by a stranger. She is able to speak Japanese as she spent time in Japan as a child and is able to help Bryce Varley interpret his flashforward which included a sign in Japanese/Kanji. (14 episodes)
 Dominic Monaghan as Dr. Simon Campos – a quantum physicist and research partner of Stanford academic Lloyd Simcoe, who does not believe he is responsible for the blackout. He told people that in his flashforward he sees himself fighting and later killing a man, which was actually a lie. In "Revelation Zero (Part 2)", it is revealed that he is "Suspect Zero"; he was given a ring that kept him awake during the blackout. His uncle is the middle man in the deal, and Simon's younger sister is kidnapped by the people that want to control the blackouts. Simon's uncle had previously killed Simon's father, and after he also kills Simon's professor, Simon kills him. (15 episodes)
 Brían F. O'Byrne as Aaron Stark – a recovering alcoholic, he is Mark Benford's AA sponsor and close friend. His daughter, Tracy, was presumed killed in action in Afghanistan, but his flashforward showed his daughter alive, mysteriously. In "The Gift", he comes home to find Tracy in his living room. Agents of the military contractor Jericho later kidnap Tracy from his home, and in "The Garden of Forking Paths", Agent Wedeck provides him assistance in getting to Afghanistan to find Tracy. (17 episodes)

Recurring characters

Production 
The pilot was written by David S. Goyer (who also directed) and Brannon Braga, from Robert J. Sawyer's novel, with Goyer and Braga executive producing alongside Jessika Borsiczky Goyer, Vince Gerardis, and Ralph Vicinanza.

FlashForward was originally developed at HBO, which sold its option because it thought the show would be a better fit for a broadcast network. After purchasing the series and ordering a pilot, ABC picked up FlashForward for thirteen episodes in May 2009. On October 12, 2009, ABC picked up the series for a 22-episode season. Later the same day, it was announced ABC had ordered a further three episodes for a 25-episode first season, which was later adjusted to 24.

On October 21, 2009, it was announced that executive producer Marc Guggenheim would leave ABC's FlashForward. Co-creator and executive producer David S. Goyer stepped in to replace him as showrunner. On February 5, 2010, Goyer announced he would be stepping down as showrunner to focus on feature films and directing. He remained involved with the show, however. Goyer was replaced as showrunner by his wife, Jessika Goyer, along with Lisa Zwerling and Timothy J. Lea.

On May 13, 2010, it was reported that FlashForward would not be renewed for a second season because of the decline of viewers. 

Each episode's title sequence includes a hidden image within the FlashForward logo to show a piece of what the episode is about. These images are visible when the sequence is paused at the right time.

Season 2 
In 2015, Robert J. Sawyer shared his memo that he sent to producers and staff writers on February 19, 2010 outlining his suggestion for season two.

Episodes

Season 1 (2009-10)

Release

Broadcast 
FlashForward aired on ABC on September 24, 2009 through May 27, 2010.

International distribution 
FlashForward has sold in over 100 territories worldwide. Overseas air-dates are typically close to the original U.S. broadcasts, in an attempt to limit piracy. 
The series airs on AXN in Mexico, Argentina, Chile, Brazil, Bulgaria, Colombia, the Czech Republic, Hungary, Japan, AXN in Poland, Portugal, Romania, Serbia, Venezuela, and Uruguay. It airs in Australia on the Seven Network, in Austria on ORF1, in Canada on /A\, and in Estonia on Fox Life. In Greece it is broadcast on FX, in Hong Kong on TVB Pearl, in New Zealand on TV2, and in Russia on Channel One. In Singapore it is shown on MediaCorp Channel 5 and Starhub Fox Channel – Channel 505, in Slovakia on TV JOJ, in Slovenia on TV3 Slovenia, in South Africa on M-Net, in Taiwan on Public Television Service, and in Turkey on Dizimax and ATV. In Western Europe, FlashForward airs on Kanal 5 in Denmark, Nelonen in Finland, Canal + and TF1 in France, ProSieben in Germany by  RTÉ Two, in Ireland, TV 2 in Norway, Cuatro in Spain, TV4 in Sweden, TSR1, La 2 & SF zwei in Switzerland, ORF1 in Austria, Five in the United Kingdom, Fox in Italy, Veronica in the Netherlands, BeTV in Belgium, and SIC in Portugal. It is also aired in the Philippines on Studio 23. In Israel it airs on Satellite TV yes stars Action as well as Cable TV HOT3., in Indonesia by RCTI.

Home media 
Season 1, Part 1 of the series was released on DVD on February 23, 2010. This DVD has the first ten episodes, plus bonus material. The full series was released on DVD on August 31, 2010 (including more bonus material). The full series was also supposed to be released on Blu-ray on the same date, but the Blu-ray release was indefinitely delayed and later cancelled.  The first 2 discs of the 5-disc full series set are the same as the 2-disc set of episodes 1-10.

It is also available to stream for free on ABC.com and for digital purchase through Amazon Prime Video, YouTube, Google Play, and Vudu. On February 23, 2021, the show was added to the steaming platform, Disney+ in Europe, Australia, New Zealand and Canada.

Fan campaign 
After the news of cancellation, dedicated fans created a campaign, "Save Flashforward" to try to keep the series on the air. They signed petitions to show support and also planned staged "blackouts" in front of ABC offices in Los Angeles, New York, Chicago, and several other major cities on June 10, 2010. Fans also sent calendars with the date April 29 circled (the date of the flashforwards and of the second global blackout), friendship bracelets based on the same items in the show, and letters to ABC President at the time, Stephen McPherson.

Reception

Ratings and viewership 
Although launching to large audiences of 12.47 million viewers in the US, the show's ratings rapidly declined to ratings about one-third that figure. The show's scheduling in the US was held to blame by some people; an unexpected extended hiatus may have contributed to the deteriorating fanbase. However, in other countries such as the UK, where the show was given prime time scheduling on terrestrial television, ratings also dwindled. In the UK, the show was screened on Channel Five, a channel which receives fairly poor viewing figures in comparison to its peers.

The show was watched by an average of 8.5 million viewers per episode, ranking it 44th most watched show of the season.

Critical reception 
FlashForward received generally positive reviews, with a Metacritic score of 72 out of 100, based on 26 critic reviews. In September 2009, Tim Goodman of the San Francisco Chronicle deemed the series "enormously entertaining" with a "tantalizing premise", while Ginia Bellafante of The New York Times wrote that it "begins in such a spirit of bracing suspense that [she was] challenged to recall another pilot that lured [her] so quickly into addiction." Variety Brian Lowry gave a more measured review, opining, "It's an intriguing, mind-bending concept that's mostly well executed [...] there's a solid desire to see more but not such wonderment as to proclaim unwavering fealty until the show peers a little farther down the road." Entertainment Weekly'''s Ken Tucker graded the series "B+", stating, "FF isn't perfect. Much thought has been given to plot and character but not enough to the visuals: This is one of the most drab-looking of intelligent shows. Thematically, FF makes major philosophical points— living in the moment, etc.—but instead of dramatizing them, it often just has its characters speak them." Tucker described the show as " sci-fi-ish conspiracy suspense with excellent prime-time-soap drama".

 Awards and nominations 

See also
 Retrocausality
 Conflict thesis, a.k.a. Draper–White thesis
 Particle accelerators in popular culture
 The Feynman Lectures on Physics''

Notes

References

External links 
 
 

 
2000s American LGBT-related drama television series
2000s American science fiction television series
2009 American television series debuts
2010s American LGBT-related drama television series
2010s American science fiction television series
2010 American television series endings
American Broadcasting Company original programming
English-language television shows
Nonlinear narrative television series
Serial drama television series
Television series by ABC Studios
Television shows set in Los Angeles
Split television seasons
Lesbian-related television shows
Television series created by Brannon Braga
Television series created by David S. Goyer
Television shows based on Canadian novels